is chairman of The Nippon Foundation, the World Health Organization Goodwill Ambassador for Leprosy Elimination, and Japan's Ambassador for the Human Rights of People Affected by leprosy. His global fight against leprosy and its accompanying stigma and social discrimination is an issue to which he has remained highly committed for more than 40 years. 
As chairman of The Nippon Foundation, Japan's largest charitable foundation, he guides public-interest activities in modern Japan. Sasakawa received his degree from Meiji University’s School of Political Science and Economics. Sasakawa's father was businessman, politician, and philanthropist Ryōichi Sasakawa.

Overview of activities 
After serving as chairman of the Japan Motorboat Racing Association, and as a director of the Japan Foundation for Shipbuilding Advancement (now the Ocean Policy Research Foundation), Yohei Sasakawa was named president of the Nippon Foundation in 1989. In July 2005, he was appointed chairman, following the retirement of Ayako Sono, the previous chair.

Known as a social entrepreneur with insight into a wide range of issues, Sasakawa is internationally recognized for his proactive planning and leadership on a global scale. Key projects include:
 Medical examinations for 200,000 children victimized by the Chernobyl nuclear power plant accident;
 Establishment of a system through which users would pay for the support of safe navigation through the Strait of Malacca;
 Development of the next generation of leaders through a global scholarship network of 69 universities;
 Establishment of a program to bring 2,000 Chinese doctors to Japan for training, and;
 Development of Arctic Sea lanes that are usable year-round.

His international aid activities have focused on three areas essential to life: food security, healthcare and education. His aid activities within Japan have focused on areas not addressed by government policies, including the development of the nation's nongovernmental organizations and volunteer activities, the enhancement of services for senior citizens and those with disabilities, and the donation of 20,000 care vehicles to social-welfare organizations throughout Japan.

Both within Japan and around the world, Sasakawa works on the front lines of humanitarian aid, believing that effective support for public interest activities demands not only funding, but personal commitment and participation.

Sasakawa has continually stressed that modern problems demand collaborative solutions, and has built wide-ranging networks encompassing the political, governmental, academic, and private sectors. One such example is Forum 2000, which he has overseen with former Czech President Václav Havel for 11 years. This initiative brings together experts and distinguished individuals from around the world to discuss global issues, and has generated a number of innovative programs as a result of their interaction.

His domestic work also transverses a wide number of areas, including the development of measures to combat maritime piracy, the publicizing of the operation of North Korean spy ships, the training of hospice nurses, and the building of networks to support crime victims. Sasakawa is also known for his efforts to ensure passage of Japan's Basic Ocean Law in 2007, and his central role in organizing the Tokyo Marathon. Through his focus on cooperation, he has been able to achieve goals that would not have been possible working single-handedly.

Leprosy elimination 
Yohei Sasakawa sees leprosy elimination as a personal mission, inherited from his father, Ryoichi Sasakawa. In 1965, he accompanied his father to a leprosy treatment facility in South Korea, and the shock at seeing, first-hand, the discrimination faced by people affected by leprosy, convinced him of the need for leprosy control, leading him to conduct own activities.

Sasakawa works to advance dialog between people affected by leprosy, government leaders, the media, and other parties in many countries, with a particular focus on places where the disease is endemic. He focuses a special amount of effort on promoting an accurate understanding of the disease: particularly the fact that it is curable and as part of this drive, he has served as WHO Goodwill Ambassador for Leprosy Elimination since May 2001.

In the 1990s, Sasakawa worked to promote the distribution of multidrug therapy (MDT) as a means of controlling leprosy. However, realizing that people affected by leprosy, and even their families, continue to face discrimination in areas such as employment and education even after they have been cured, he has advocated that leprosy be approached not simply as a medical issue but as a social one involving human-rights concerns.

In July 2003, he visited the Office of the United Nations High Commissioner for Human Rights, seeking to bring the issue before the United Nations Human Rights Committee (now the United Nations Human Rights Council). Subsequently, in March 2004, he raised the matter at a plenary session of the Commission. As a result, in August 2004, the Sub-Commission on the Promotion and Protection of Human Rights initiated studies to formally address leprosy and its related discrimination issues as a human-rights issue, eventually unanimously approving a resolution calling on national governments, leprosy-related organizations and UN institutions to improve the current state of affairs.

Since then, Sasakawa has continued to work to resolve leprosy's social aspects, for example establishing the Sasakawa-India Leprosy Foundation in 2006 to assist the independence of people affected by the disease.

Sasakawa's international achievements in controlling leprosy have resulted in a number of international prizes, such as the Yomiuri Shimbun’s Yomiuri International Cooperation Prize (2004), and India's International Gandhi Award (2007). Most recently, the Japanese foreign ministry appointed him as its  Ambassador for the Human Rights of People Affected by Leprosy.

Maritime affairs 
Today, Sasakawa is also active in the very different field of maritime issues. He has proposed the establishment of a new fund through which users would voluntarily contribute to the costs involved in securing maritime safety in the Strait of Malacca, one of the world's busiest sea lanes. By explaining the need for this, in light of today's international conditions, he advances activities intended to overturn the traditional idea that use of all sea-routes should be free of charge. In addition, he is advancing new initiatives to address maritime issues in Japan, including the establishment of the nation's first Basic Ocean Law, working to change the Japanese paradigm that it is a country protected by the sea, to one that protects the seas. Beyond the shores of Japan and the wider region, Sasakawa also established in 2004 the United Nations – Nippon Foundation Fellowship Programme to contribute to the building of a new generation of ocean leaders and professionals.

Advocating for the importance of information disclosure by public-interest groups, Sasakawa maintains a daily blog (in Japanese) of his activities and thoughts. Under Sasakawa's leadership, The Nippon Foundation's disclosure efforts have won high marks amid government reforms of the public interest field. In addition to creating a website (CANPAN CSR Plus) that helps businesses to participate directly in social-welfare activities, fulfilling their corporate social responsibility (CSR), Sasakawa advocates for work toward a society based on an integration of national and local governments, nonprofit organizations, and corporate CSR efforts. The aim is a society where all members participate in creating the common good.

Major achievements at the Nippon Foundation 
2018
Announced the launch of the CHANGE FOR THE BLUE project as a new, large-scale, nationwide initiative bringing together multiple stakeholders including private-sector entities, the government, and academic institutions to find and implement practical programs to address the problem of marine debris. 　
Launched the 13th Global Appeal to end stigma and discrimination against persons affected by leprosy, endorsed by Disabled Peoples’ International, from New Delhi, India. Held the National Leprosy Conference in Myanmar, attended by State Counsellor Aung San Suu Kyi, calling for an end to discrimination against persons affected by leprosy.
Signed the Myanmar Nationwide Ceasefire Agreement (NCA) between the Myanmar Government and two ethnic armed organizations as a witness and in the capacity of Special Envoy of the Government of Japan. As with the NCA signed in 2015, Japan was the only non-adjacent country invited to this signing ceremony and pledged continued support for the peace process. 　
Held a ceremony to mark the completion of 460 schools built in cooperation with the Government of Myanmar. Begun in 2002, the school construction program in Myanmar has built 300 schools in Shan State, 100 schools in Rakhine State, and 60 schools in Ayeyarwady Region.　
Held the True Colours Festival, an arts festival featuring performances by artists with disabilities from 18 countries, in Singapore.　
Opened The Nippon Foundation Para Arena, a dedicated para sports gymnasium in Odaiba, Tokyo, that will provide a training environment for athletes aiming to compete in the Tokyo 2020 Paralympic Games.　
Held the first international conference in Asia dealing with human rights issues faced by persons with albinism, focusing on sub-Saharan Africa, in close collaboration with the United Nations Independent Expert on the enjoyment of human rights by persons with albinism.

2017
Was awarded Gandhi Peace Prize for his contributions towards leprosy eradication in India and around the world. Former winners of Gandhi Peace Prize include Nelson Mandela (2000) and Desmond Tutu (2005). Jury for the award is chaired by the Prime minister of India.
At a plenary meeting of the United Nations Ocean Conference, proposed that the United Nations establish an intergovernmental panel for comprehensive ocean governance.　
Together with the Inter-Parliamentary Union (IPU), launched Global Appeal 2017, for the elimination of stigma and discrimination against persons affected by leprosy, from New Delhi, India.
Held a ceremony to mark the completion of buildings for conflict-affected people in southeast Myanmar as the part of the First Rehabilitation Programme, started in March 2016. Based on a further request from the Myanmar side, started the Second Rehabilitation Programme, which includes construction of houses, schools, health care centers and wells, in Kayin State and Mon State with the support of the Ministry of Foreign Affairs of Japan. Signed a partnership agreement with the Tokyo Organising Committee of the Olympic and Paralympic Games for cooperation and coordination in the area of volunteer activities for the Tokyo 2020 Olympic and Paralympic Games.

2016
Jointly organized the International Symposium on Leprosy and Human Rights in the Vatican with the Pontifical Council for Health Care Workers and the Good Samaritan Foundation. The Symposium adopted and approved Conclusion and Recommendations calling for an end to stigma and discrimination against persons affected by leprosy.
Established The Nippon Foundation Ocean Innovation Consortium, a nationwide initiative that engages the industrial, academic, public, and private sectors with the aim of building human capacity in offshore development.
Completed a distribution program to provide food and humanitarian assistance in conflict-affected areas in Myanmar, reaching a total of approximately 500,000 people over five years.
Launched the Rehabilitation Program, with the support of the Ministry of Foreign Affairs of Japan and with the agreement of the Government of Myanmar, to build houses, schools, health clinics and other facilities for conflict-affected people in Myanmar. The program covers the region under the influence of the ethnic armed organizations that signed the Nationwide Ceasefire Agreement in 2015.
Launched the Seabed 2030, an initiative to map the world's ocean floor by the year 2030.
The Japan-China Sasakawa Medical Fellowship, established to promote mutual understanding and friendship between China and Japan in medicine and health care in 1987, marked its 30th anniversary and saw the number of fellows reach approximately 2,200.

2015
Launched the Maritime Safety and Security Policy Program (MSP), one of the few programs to offer a master's degree in this field. This joint effort with the Japan International Cooperation Agency (JICA), National Graduate Institute for Policy Studies (GRIPS), and the Japan Coast Guard nurtures specialists in the field of maritime safety and security in Asia.
Established The Nippon Foundation Paralympic Support Center to strengthen the functions of  national Para sports federations and to raise public awareness of paralympic movements, toward the 2020 Tokyo Paralympic Games and beyond.　
Led the Japanese government delegation of election observers in the Myanmar General Election. Confirmed that the elections were held in a fair manner as a significant first step towards progress in democratization.
Signed the Myanmar Nationwide Ceasefire Agreement between the Myanmar Government and eight ethnic armed organizations as a witness and in the capacity of Special Envoy of the Government of Japan. Japan was the only non-adjacent country invited to this Signing Ceremony and pledged continued support for the peace process. 
 
2014
The number of Sasakawa Fellows from the International Maritime University (IMU) and the International Maritime Law Institute (IMLI) combined passed the 1,000 mark.

2013
Appointed as Special Envoy of the Government of Japan for National Reconciliation in Myanmar. Assisted in promoting dialogue between the Government of Myanmar and ethnic armed organizations at their request.　

2012
Led the distribution of US$3 million of food and medicine to conflict-affected people in inaccessible areas of Myanmar  under the influence of ethnic armed organizations.
Initiated a series of regional international symposia on leprosy and human rights to raise awareness and enhance implementation of the UN resolution and accompanying Principles and Guidelines on elimination of discrimination against persons affected by leprosy and their family members. The first symposium was held in Rio de Janeiro, Brazil. Subsequent symposia were held in New Delhi (2012), in Addis Ababa, Ethiopia (2013), in Rabat, Morocco (2014) and concluded with the final symposium in Geneva (2015) incorporating a research report and recommendations by an International Working Group.

2011
Conducted various relief work projects in the wake of the Great East Japan Earthquake and Tsunami including distribution of emergency aid supplies, support for nearly 700 volunteer groups working in affected areas, and a symposium where world-leading experts on radiation and health discussed the health risks for people in Fukushima. These initiatives were funded by both domestic and overseas public donations.
Initiated the Tokyo-Washington Dialog to develop bilateral policy proposals

2010
Assisted the Japanese government in submitting a resolution on “elimination of discrimination against persons affected by leprosy and their family members” together with accompanying “Principles and Guidelines” to the UN Human Rights Council. The resolution was subsequently adopted by the UN General Assembly.
Established schools of prosthetics and orthotics in Indonesia and the Philippines

2009
Launched ASEAN Secretariat – The Nippon Foundation Project on Leprosy and Human Dignity

2008	
As the Japanese Government's Goodwill Ambassador for the Human Rights of Persons Affected by Leprosy, assisted the Japanese government in submitting to the UN Human Rights Council a draft resolution on “elimination of discrimination against persons affected by leprosy and their family members” by the UN Human Rights Council.

2007
Established the Aids to Navigation Fund, a new initiative for the protection of the Malacca-Singapore Straits

2006
Established the Sasakawa-India Leprosy Foundation in New Delhi
Launched the Global Appeal to End Stigma and Discrimination against Persons Affected by Leprosy

2004
Launched the Traditional Medicine Project in Mongolia

2000  
Built an international network of maritime universities

2000  
Initiated The Nippon Foundation Fellowships for Asian Public Intellectuals (API Fellowships) in five countries in Asia

1999  
Provided pediatric medical assistance to victims of the Chernobyl Disaster

1993  
Chaired an international joint research program to develop an Arctic shipping route

1991  
Contributed extensively to the WHO program to eliminate leprosy

1987  
Established the Sasakawa Medical Scholarship Program to train 2000 Chinese medical doctors

1987  
Created the Sasakawa Young Leaders Fellowship Fund (SYLFF), a grant-in-aid program which has resulted in a network of 69 major universities worldwide

1986  
Initiated the Sasakawa Global 2000 Program to enable African nations to achieve self-sufficiency in staple crop production

1967  
Provided support for a navigational safety program in the Malacca-Singapore Straits

Other professional positions 
Special Envoy of the Government of Japan for National Reconciliation in Myanmar [2013–Present]
Goodwill Ambassador for the Welfare of the National Races in Myanmar 
(Appointed by the Minister of Foreign Affairs of Japan) [2012–Present]  
Goodwill Ambassador for the Human Rights of Persons Affected by Leprosy
(Appointed by the Minister of Foreign Affairs of Japan) [2007–Present]
World Health Organization Goodwill Ambassador for Leprosy Elimination [2001–Present]
 Trustee, Foundation Franco-Japonaise Sasakawa
 Trustee, United States-Japan Foundation
 Trustee, Scandinavia-Japan Sasakawa Foundation
 Trustee, The Great Britain Sasakawa Foundation
 Advisor, The Tokyo Foundation
 Advisor, The Sasakawa Japan-China Friendship Fund

Honors 
 2019 Person of Cultural Merit
 2019 Grand Cordon of the Order of the Rising Sun, Japan
 2018 Gandhi Peace Prize (Awarded in 2019)
 2018 Honorary Citizenship of the Republic of Palau
 2018 The Royal Order of Monisaraphon Knight Grand Cross, Cambodia
 2017 Ocean's 8 Award, The Intergovernmental Oceanographic Commission of UNESCO
 2017 Health and Human Rights Award (International Council of Nurses)
 2017 Plus ratio quam vis Medal (Jagiellonian University, Poland)
 2017 Health-for・All Gold Medal (WHO)
 2016 The Award of Distinction of the President of Bulgarian Academy of Sciences
 2015 International Maritime Prize (IMO) (Awarded in 2014)
 2014 The Rule of Law Award (International Bar Association)
 2013  Gold Medal for Merits (Republic of Serbia)
 2013  Friendship Medal (Socialist Republic of Vietnam)
 2011  Grand Cross of the Royal Order of Sahametrei (Cambodia)
 2011  Commander of the Order of Recognition (Central African Republic)
 2010  Knight of the Order of the Dannebrog (Denmark)
 2010  Order of Timor-Leste (East Timor)
 2010 Ethiopian Millenium Gold Medal
 2010  Commander of the Order of the White Rose of Finland
 2010  Commander's Cross with Star of the Order of the Falcon (Iceland)
 2010  Commander of the Order of the Defender of the Realm (Malaysia)
 2010  Commander of the Royal Norwegian Order of Merit (Norway)
 2010  Commander First Class of the Royal Order of the Polar Star (Sweden)
 2010  Dr. Norman E. Borlaug Medallion of the World Food Prize
 2010  The Diploma of an Academician of the Russian Academy of Natural Sciences
 2010  The Patriarch's Chart of the Patriarch of Moscow and All Russia Kirill
 2007  Order of the Pole Star (Mongolia)
 2007  Coast Guard Legion of Honor (Degree of Maginoo)
 2006  Commander of the National Order of Mali
 2006 International Gandhi Award
 2004 Yomiuri International Cooperation Prize (Japan)
 2003  Commander of the Royal Order of Monisaraphon (Cambodia)
 2003  National Construction Decoration (Cambodia)
 2003  Officer of the National Order of Madagascar (Republic of Madagascar)
 2003 The Special Award (World Maritime University, Sweden)
 2001 Václav Havel Memorial Medal (President Václav Havel, Czech Republic)
 2001  Millennium Gandhi Award (International Leprosy Union)
 2000  Decerne la Medaille d'Honneur de Menerbes (France)
 2000  International Green Pen Awards honour Pacific Environmental Journalism (Fiji)
 2000  Grand Officer of the Order for Merit (Romania)
 1998 Al Hussein Bin Ali Decoration for Accomplishment, First Degree (Jordan)
 1998 Health For All Gold Medal (World Health Organization)
 1997 China Health Medal (Republic of China)
 1996  Francis Skorina Medal (Belarus)
 1996  Commander of the Order of Merit for Distinguished Service (Peru)
 1996 Kin Inka Sho (Peru)
 1996  Order of Friendship (Russian Federation)
 1996  Order of Merit, Third Class (Ukraine)
 1995  Order of the Grand Star of Djibouti (Republic of Djibouti)
 1989  Grand Officer of the Order of Mono (Togo)

Honorary degrees 
 2019 Doctor of Humanities, Ateneo de Manila University, Philippines
 2018 Honorary Doctor, Institute of Engineering and Technology, Mongolia
 2018 Advisory Professor, Jilin University, China
 2017  Doctor of Laws, University of Minnesota, USA
 2016  Doctor Honoris Causa, Sofia University, Bulgaria
 2013  Honorary Degree of Doctor of the University, University of York, The United Kingdom
 2012  Honorary Degree of Doctor of Humanities, University of Malaya, Malaysia
 2012  Honorary Degree of Doctor of Agricultural Development Honoris Causa, Hawassa University
 2010  Honorary Academician, Russian Academy of Natural Science
 2009  Honorary Professorship, Yunnan University, China
 2008  Honorary Degree of Doctor in Humane Letters, University for Peace
 2008  Honorary Professorship, Dalian University of Foreign Language, China
 2007  Honorary Doctor of Humanity, University of Cambodia, Cambodia
 2007  Honorary Professorship, Guizhou University, China
 2007  Honorary Doctorate of Humane Letters, Rochester Institute of Technology, USA
 2006  Honorary Professorship, Dalian Maritime University, China
 2005  Doctor Honoris Causa, Jadavpur University, India
 2004  Honorary Professorship, Shanghai Maritime University, China
 2004  Doctor Honoris Causa, World Maritime University, Sweden
 2004  Honorary Professorship, Heilongjiang University, China
 2004  Honorary Professorship, Harbin Medical University, China
 2003  Honorary Professorship, China Medical University, China
 2003  Doctor Honoris Causa, The Academy of Management, Mongolia
 2000  Doctor Honoris Causa, The University of Bucharest, Romania
 2000  Doctor Honoris Causa, The University of Cape Coast, Ghana
 2000  Honorary Professorship, Yanbian University, China

Publication 
2019	No Matter Where the Journey Takes Me: One Man's Quest for a Leprosy-Free World, C. Hurst & Co. (Publishers) Ltd, London (English)
2019	My Struggle against Leprosy, Festina Lente Japan, Tokyo (English)

References

"Shukumei No Senki, Yohei Sasakawa Hansenbyou Seiatsu No Kiroku  (My Life's Work, Yohei Sasakawa The Battle Against Leprosy)" Fumihiko Takayama(2017), Shogakukan
"Shukumei No Ko, Sasakawa Ichizoku No Shinwa (Born with a Mission, The Story of the Sasakawa Family)" Fumihiko Takayama(2014), Shogakukan
"Social Change, Yohei Sasakawa Nippon Zaidan To Ikikata Wo Kataru, (Social Change, Yohei Sasakawa Discusses Life and The Nippon Foundation)" Takashi Ito (2019), Chuo Koron Shinsha

External links 
 The Nippon Foundation Website
 Nippon Foundation YouTube

1939 births
Japanese philanthropists
Japanese activists
Living people
Knights of the Order of the Dannebrog
Commanders First Class of the Order of the Polar Star
Knights Grand Cross of the Royal Order of Cambodia
Commanders of the National Order of Mali
Recipients of the Gandhi Peace Prize
Members of the Royal Order of Monisaraphon
Recipients of orders, decorations, and medals of Madagascar